This is a list of all managers of Antalyaspor, including honours.

Managers

References

Notes